The 2002–03 A Group was the 55th season of the top Bulgarian national football league (commonly referred to as A Group) and the 79th edition of a Bulgarian national championship tournament.

Changes from last season
Beroe, Belasitsa Petrich, and Spartak Pleven were relegated at the end of the last season. The relegated teams were replaced by three teams from B PFG. These teams were Botev Plovdiv, Dobrudzha Dobrich, and Rilski Sportist Samokov. Botev return after a one-year absence, Dobrudzha return after a two-year absence, while Rilski Sportist made their debut in the top tier of Bulgarian football.

Overview
It was contested by 14 teams, and CSKA Sofia won the championship.
The Reds finished with 66 points in total, six points above archrivals Levski Sofia. CSKA Sofia qualified for the 2003-04 Champions League qualifying rounds, while Levski and third placed Litex Lovech qualified for the UEFA Cup for next season. Marek Dupnitsa qualified for the Intertoto Cup. 

At the end of the season, Dobrudzha Dobrich and Rilski Sportist were relegated after just one season in the elite. Only two teams were relegated, because the league was expanded the following season from 14 to 16 teams.

League standings

Results

Champions
CSKA Sofia

Ivanov and Deyanov left the club during a season.

Top scorers

References

External links
Bulgaria - List of final tables (RSSSF)
2002–03 Statistics of A Group at a-pfg.com

First Professional Football League (Bulgaria) seasons
Bulgaria
1